Airedale and Ferry Fryston is an electoral ward of the City of Wakefield district used for elections to Wakefield Metropolitan District Council.

Overview 
The ward is one of 21 in the Wakefield district, and has been held by Labour since the current boundaries were formed for the 2004 Council election. As of 2015, the electorate stands at 12,495 of which 97.2% identify as "White British" and 64.9% of who identify as Christian.

The ward is situated in the north east of the District and forms the eastern part of the settlement of Castleford. The ward is relatively small in area terms, being fairly densely populated. The ward includes a number of different neighbourhoods, including Airedale, Ferry Fryston, Townville and Fryston Village. The northern edge of the ward is defined by the course of the River Aire, while to the east and south the ward is bounded by the A1(M) and M62 motorways.

Representation 
Like all wards in the Wakefield district, Pontefract North has 3 councillors, whom are elected on a 4-year-rota. This means elections for new councillors are held for three years running, with one year every four years having no elections.

In 2020, Alex Kear (Independent) was removed from the council after he plead guilty child sexual exploitation charges.

The current councillors are Les Shaw (Labour), Kathryn Scott (Labour) and Jackie Ferguson (Labour).

Councillors

Ward results 

This by-election was held due to the death of Graham Phelps in November 2009.

Notes

References 

Wards of Wakefield
Politics of Wakefield
City of Wakefield